Robert George Fernley (born 7 January 1953) is a British motorsport manager and entrepreneur who currently serves as chairman of the FIA Single-Seater Commission.

Career 
Fernley has a long history of managing racing teams, having owned a lot of equipment in the United States, especially for the IndyCar series.

He also has a long association with Vijay Mallya, so when the Indian businessman acquired the Spyker F1 team and turned it into Force India, it did not take long for Fernley to join the new team's board. He was Force India's deputy team principal, and was in charge of the team's operations on race weekends when Mallya—who had not been able to leave the UK in years—did not show up. He also dealt with matters relating to the FIA and Formula 1 organizers. Fernley left Force India after purchasing his assets by a consortium led by Lawrence Stroll in August 2018.

On November 15, 2018, Fernley was announced as president of McLaren's Indianapolis 500 project. He assumed the role as a subordinate of Zak Brown, CEO of McLaren. In May 2019, it was announced that McLaren would not renew Fernley's contract after Fernando Alonso failed to qualify for the 2019 Indianapolis 500.

On December 17, 2020, it was announced that Fernley would replace Stefano Domenicali as chairman of the FIA Single-Seater Commission.

References

1953 births
Living people
Formula One people
Force India
British motorsport people